Jörn Hellner (born 6 October 1945) is an Australian sailor. He competed in the Tempest event at the 1976 Summer Olympics.

References

External links
 

1945 births
Living people
Australian male sailors (sport)
Olympic sailors of Australia
Sailors at the 1976 Summer Olympics – Tempest
Place of birth missing (living people)